The 1916–17 team finished with a record of 16–1. It was the 2nd and last year for head coach Elmer D. Mitchell. The team captain was Elton Rynearson.

Schedule

|-
!colspan=9 style="background:#006633; color:#FFFFFF;"| Non-conference regular season

References

Eastern Michigan Eagles men's basketball seasons
Michigan State Normal